The 2006 AFC Youth Championship was the 34th instance of the AFC Youth Championship. It was held from 29 October to 12 November 2006 in India. It was the first time for India to host this tournament. Sixteen teams from the AFC qualified to the finals.

The tournament was won by North Korea, their second championship after sharing the trophy with Iran in 1976, defeating Japan 5–3 in a penalty shootout after extra time finished in a 1–1 draw. South Korea defeated Jordan 2–0 to finish third.

The tournament also served as the Asian qualifying tournament for the 2007 FIFA U-20 World Cup, with a place for the 4 semi-finalists of the tournament.

Qualification

33 Teams entered the Qualification, the teams were drawn into 14 groups. 11 groups with each three teams and 3 groups with two teams. The Qualification took part from November 2005 to December 2005 (except Group D which was scheduled to play in November 2005 but was postponed after the 2005 Amman bombings and played in February 2006). The Group-Winners qualified for the tournament, a Play-Off Game between the best second-placed teams from ASEAN (Myanmar) and East Asia (North Korea) was scheduled to in Kuala Lumpur on 15 February 2006. But after the withdrawal of Myanmar, the North Koreans qualified automatically. Hosts India were exempt from the qualification.

Final tournament

Participants

Venues

Squads

Group stage

Group A
{| class="wikitable" style="text-align: center;"
|-
!width=165|Team
!width=20|Pts
!width=20|Pld
!width=20|W
!width=20|D
!width=20|L
!width=20|GF
!width=20|GA
!width=20|GD
|- style="background:#cfc;"
|style="text-align:left;"|
|9||3||3||0||0||13||0||+13
|- style="background:#cfc;"
| style="text-align:left;"|
|4||3||1||1||1||3||5||−2
|-
|style="text-align:left;"|
|2||3||0||2||1||1||8||−7
|-
| style="text-align:left;"|
|1||3||0||1||2||3||7||−4
|}

Group B

Group C

Group D

Knockout stage

Bracket

Quarter finals

Semi finals

Third Place Play Off

Finals

Winners

Qualification to World Youth Championship
The following teams qualified for the 2007 FIFA World Youth Championship.

Awards

Goalscorers
5 goals
 Shim Young-sung
4 goals
 Alaa Abdul-Zahra
 Kim Kum-il
 Shin Young-rok
3 goals
 Wang Yongpo
 Yasuhito Morishima
 Yosuke Kashiwagi
 Lee Sang-ho
 Song Jin-hyung
2 goals

 David Williams
 Nathan Burns
 Mostafa Chatrabgoon
 Kazuhisa Kawahara
 Kota Aoki
 Ahmed Nofal
 Jong Chol-min
 Mohammad Al-Sahlawi
 Jufain Al-Bishi

1 goal

 Chris Grossman
 Dario Vidosic
 Xu De'en
 Yang Xu
 Branco Vincent Cardozo
 Lal Kamal Bhowmick
 Paresh Matondkar
 Farhad Ale-Khamis
 Kamaleddin Kamyabinia
 Shahram Goudarzi
 Aqeel Hussein
 Halkurd Mulla Mohammed
 Mohamed Khalaf
 Osama Ali
 Ildar Amirov
 Masato Morishige
 Tsukasa Umesaki
 Abdullah Deeb
 Badr Abu Salim
 Lo'ay Omran
 Mohd Khyril Muhymeen Zambri
 Pak Chol-min
 Ri Chol-myong
 Ri Hung-ryong
 Yun Yong-il
 Ahmad Kabee
 Ali Ataif
 Mohamed Al-Bishi
 Kim Dong-suk
 Lee Chung-yong
 Park Hyun-beom
 Akhtam Khamrakulov
 Phonlawut Donchui
 Suttinun Phukhom
 Teerasil Dangda
 Ibrahim Ali
 Mubarak Mesmari
 Nguyễn Quang Tình
 Nguyễn Văn Khải

Own goals
 Stepan Miagkih (playing against South Korea)
 Baddrol Bakhtiar (playing against Vietnam)

Top scoring teams

19 goals 

12 goals 

10 goals 

 8 goals 

 7 goals 

 6 goals 
Australia

 5 goals 

 3 goals 

 2 goal 

 1 goal

References

External links
 AFC Youth Championship 2006 Official Site – the-AFC.com (archived)

 
Youth
2006
2006
2006–07 in Indian football
2006 in youth association football